Great Mother may refer to:

Goddesses
Mother goddesses of various traditions, representing motherhood, fertility, creation, or the bounty of the Earth:
Nammu, Sumerian creation goddess.
Cybele, Roman goddess with the title Magna Mater (Latin for "Great Mother")
Đạo Mẫu, in Vietnamese tradition
Maia (mythology), Roman goddess
Prajnaparamita, and the wisdom of the Madhyamaka, in the Mahayana and Vajrayana
Yum Chenmo "Great Mother of Wisdom", a Tibetan deity of whom Machig Labdrön is considered an emanation
Great Mother, an archetypal image in Analytical psychology

Other uses
The Great Mother, a book by psychologist Erich Neumann
Great Mother (Dungeons & Dragons), a deity character in the Dungeons & Dragons role-playing game
Great Father and Great Mother, titles used in North America during the 19th century in interactions with indigenous peoples to refer to various heads of state

See also
Goddess, a female deity
Great Goddess, the concept of an almighty goddess or mother goddess, or a matriarchal religion
Magna Mater (disambiguation)